Worse for the Wear is the third album by The New Amsterdams, released in 2003 on Vagrant Records.

Background 
This is the first New Amsterdams album to have a full band, as the previous albums have always been primarily solo material from the lead singer Matt Pryor as a side project from The Get Up Kids.  It was recorded over the course of three months at the Red House Studios in Eudora, Kansas. The album was recorded with Rob and Ryan Pope, as well as longtime friend and producer Ed Rose after the release of the third Get Up Kids album On a Wire, and because the band was promoting that album at the time, The New Amsterdams did not tour extensively to promote the album, although they did make an appearance on the Late Show with David Letterman. The 3rd episode of One Tree Hill, Season One, was named after 'Are You True?'.

Track listing

Reception 
"With its touches of banjo, flashes of wry humor, and more sprightly tempos [...] Worse for the Wear is the most relaxed-sounding and brightest New Amsterdams record yet, and with songs as catchy as "The Spoils of the Spoiled," and the oddly '70s rock piano-based tune, "From California," the New Amsterdams are in danger of taking over from the Get Up Kids as Pryor's most interesting and memorable band." - Allmusic

"The most basic thing to be said is that the album is fine. It's not really that bad. Not really exciting, either . . . just fine." -  popmatters

Personnel
Matt Pryor - Vocals, Guitar, Lap Steel, and Pump Organ (on "Vignette")
Rob Pope - Bass
Ryan Pope - Drums and Percussion
Ed Rose - Guitar, Drums, Producer, Engineering, and Mixing
Kory Willis - Banjo, Lap Steel
Joe Gastwirt - Mastering
Ron Hayes - Associate Producer
Alex Brahl - Management
Andrew Ellis - Booking

References

2003 albums
The New Amsterdams albums
Albums produced by Ed Rose
Vagrant Records albums